The 1995 ICF Canoe Slalom World Championships were held in Nottingham, United Kingdom under the auspices of International Canoe Federation at the Holme Pierrepont National Watersports Centre. It was the 24th edition. Nottingham became the first city to host the canoe slalom and canoe sprint world championships, having hosted the sprint championships previously in 1981.

Medal summary

Men's

Canoe

Kayak

Women's

Kayak

Medals table

References
Official results
International Canoe Federation

Icf Canoe Slalom World Championships, 1995
ICF Canoe Slalom World Championships
Canoe
Icf Canoe Slalom World Championships, 1995
1990s in Nottingham
Sport in Nottingham
Canoeing and kayaking competitions in the United Kingdom
Canoeing in England